Inga cordistipula is a species of tree in the family Fabaceae. It was described by German botanist Carl Friedrich Philipp von Martius. It can be found in Colombia and Brazil.

References

Trees of Brazil
Trees of Colombia
Trees of South America
cordistipula